Strojiči ( or ; in older sources also Strojč) is a small settlement in the Municipality of Osilnica in southern Slovenia, right on the border with Croatia. The area is part of the traditional region of Lower Carniola and is now included in the Southeast Slovenia Statistical Region.

References

External links
Strojiči on Geopedia

Populated places in the Municipality of Osilnica